Blood-Horse Publications is an American multimedia publishing house focused on horse-related magazines headquartered in Lexington, Kentucky. It began in 1916 through its flagship magazine, The Blood-Horse. From 1961 to 2015, Blood-Horse Publications was owned by the Thoroughbred Owners and Breeders Association, a non-profit organization that promotes Thoroughbred racing and breeding. In 2015, The Jockey Club became the majority owner. According to the company, Blood-Horse has subscribers from over 80 countries worldwide. and according to ESPN is the thoroughbred industry's most-respected trade publication.

Executive
Publisher & CEO
 Marla Bickel

Board of Trustees
 Stuart S. Janney III - Chairman
 G. Watts Humphrey, Jr. - Vice Chairman
 Antony Beck
 D. G. Van Clief, Jr.

Publications
Their book-publishing arm is Eclipse Press. They also distribute a mail-order catalog of horse-related items, called Exclusively Equine that offers publications such as the Kentucky Derby Souvenir Magazine and Commemorative Collector's Issues and run several websites.

 The Blood-Horse
 TBH Marketwatch
 TBH Auction Edge
 Keeneland Magazine

Products and services
 TrueNicks
 Stallion Register Online 
The Blood-Horse Source Online

References

External links
Eclipse Press
 Bloodhorse.com
 TheHorse.com
 tryanimal.com
 ExclusivelyEquine.com

Companies based in Lexington, Kentucky
Magazine publishing companies of the United States
Publishing companies established in 1916
Equine firms based in Kentucky
Publishing companies based in Kentucky